{{Speciesbox
| image = Salmonete del mar Rojo (Parupeneus forsskali), Pistol Bay, Pafos, Chipre, 2021-12-12, DD 14.jpg
| image_caption =Parupeneus forsskali in the Mediterranean Sea
| status = LC
| status_system = IUCN3.1
| status_ref = 
| taxon = Parupeneus forsskali
| authority =(Fourmanoir & Guézé, 1976)
| synonyms = *Pseudupeneus forsskali Fourmanoir & Guézé, 1976 
Mullus auriflamma Forsskål, 1775 Mulloides auriflamma (Forsskål, 1775) Mulloidichthys auriflamma (Forsskål, 1775)
| synonyms_ref = 
}}Parupeneus forsskali, common name Red Sea goatfish, is a species of goatfish belonging to the family Mullidae.

Etymology
The species name forsskali honors the Swedish naturalist and explorer Peter Forsskål (1732-1763). Forsskål originally described this fish as Mullus auriflamma but the International Commission on Zoological Nomenclature suppressed this name in its decision number 846 and in 1976 Fourmanoir & Guézé proposed the name Pseudupeneus forsskali.

Distribution and habitat
This species is endemic to the Red Sea and Gulf of Aden. It is also present in the Mediterranean Sea since its first confirmed record in 2012. These marine subtropical fish are shallow sandy bottoms, with a depth range .

The Red Sea goatfish has a relatively elongate body and a pointed snout, with the twin chin barbels typical of goatfishes. These fish have eight dorsal spines, nine dorsal soft rays and seven anal soft rays. The body color is white with a broad black to dark brown stripe, sometimes tending to reddish, reaching from the upper lip through the eye and along the body, followed by an irregular roundish black spot at the base of the yellow caudal peduncle. Body above stripe is grayish green. The caudal fin is yellow, while the second dorsal and anal fins have narrow blue and yellow stripes.CIESM

Biology
Red Sea goatfish spend most of their time moving slowly in small groups over the bottom searching for prey with their barbels. They mainly feed on small invertebrates living on sand bottoms (worms, small crustaceans).

Bibliography
 Fenner, Robert M.: The Conscientious Marine Aquarist. Neptune City, USA : T.F.H. Publications, 2001.
 Helfman, G., B. Collette y D. Facey: The diversity of fishes. Blackwell Science, Malden, Massachusetts, USA 1997.
 Hoese, D.F. 1986: . A M.M. Smith y P.C. Heemstra (eds.) Smiths' sea fishes. Springer-Verlag, Berlin
 Manal M. Sabrah - Fisheries biology of the Red Sea goatfish Parupeneus forsskali (Fourmanoir & Guézé, 1976) from the northern Red Sea, Hurghada, Egypt - The Egyptian Journal of Aquatic Research - Volume 41, Issue 1, 2015, Pages 111–117
 Maugé, L.A. 1986.  A J. Daget, J.-P. Gosse y D.F.E. Thys van den Audenaerde (eds.) Check-list of the freshwater fishes of Africa (CLOFFA). ISNB Bruxelles.
 Moyle, P. y J. Cech.: Fishes: An Introduction to Ichthyology, 4th. Ed., Upper Saddle River, USA - Prentice-Hall. 2000.
 Nelson, J.: Fishes of the World, 3rd. ed. USA: John Wiley and Sons.1994.
 Randall, J.E. (2004) Revision of the goatfish genus Parupeneus (Perciformes: Mullidae), with descriptions of two new species., Indo-Pacific Fishes (36):64 p
 Steven Weinberg - Découvrir la mer Rouge et l'océan Indien (2005)
 Wheeler, A.: The World Encyclopedia of Fishes'', 2nd. Ed, London: Macdonald. Año

References

External links
 

forsskali
Articles containing video clips
Fish described in 1976